Yusafwala railway station (Urdu and ) is located in Yusafwala village, Sahiwal district of Punjab province of the Pakistan.

History
A coal handling facility was also developed at the station to supply coal to Sahiwal Coal Power Project.

See also
 List of railway stations in Pakistan
 Pakistan Railways

References

Railway stations in Sahiwal District
Railway stations on Karachi–Peshawar Line (ML 1)